Leon IV or Leo IV may refer to:
Leo IV the Khazar (750 – 780), Byzantine Emperor
Pope Leo IV, pope from 847 – 855
Leo IV, King of Armenia (1309 – 1341), last Hethumid king of Cilicia
Leo IV (dwarf galaxy), a dwarf satellite galaxy of the Milky Way